Bandit Petersburg (or Gangster Petersburg) is a Russian detective television series. It was one of the most successful Russian series of the early 2000s.

The first two parts premiered in May 2000 on the NTV channel. In total, ten seasons were produced, the last of which was broadcast in 2007. The only character who appears in 9 seasons (except the film The Operative), is Lieutenant Colonel Kudasov by Yevgeny Sidikhin.

Music 
The series' theme song is  The City that isn't there,  by singer and composer Igor Kornelyuk, and lyricist  . Part I of the series also features  You're a Stranger To Me  by Tatiana Bulanova as a secondary theme.

Anachronism 
Although the events of the series are portrayed as taking place in the late 1980s to early 1990s, anachronistic objects such as car models, mobile phones, personal computers, signage and media appear in the series; even gravestones with dates from the late 1990s appear.

Cast  
 Yevgeny Sidikhin as Lieutenant Colonel Nikita Nikitich Kudasov - Season 1-4, 6-10
 Aleksandr Domogarov as Andrei  Seregin (Obnorsky), the Journalist - Season 1-6
 Lev Borisov  as Viktor Govorov (Antibiotic, the Criminal Authority ) - Season 1-6
  as Detective Alexander   Zverev - Season 4-7, 9
  as Banker Nikolai Naumov (Kolya-Vanya) - Season 4-7
 Andrei Tolubeyev as Deputy ORB Head Gennady Vaschanov - Season 1-3, 5
 Yan Tsapnik as Igor Nikiforov, the Journalist (Seregin's colleague) - Season 3, 7-10
 Alexander Peskov as  Vladimir Dmitrievich Nefedov (Businessman and Crime Boss) - season 7-10
 Yuri Itskov as Valentin Losev (Kingpin Prongs) - season 7-10
 Dmitry Pevtsov  as Sergei Aleksandrovich Chelishchev (Black Attorney) - Season 2  
 Aleksei Serebryakov as  Oleg  Zvantsev (White Attorney) - Season 2 
 Olga Drozdova / Anna Samokhina as Catherina Zvantseva (childhood friend and sweetheart of both attorneys) - Season 2 (4-6)
 Kirill Lavrov as Yuri Aleksandrovich Mikheev (Kingpin Baron) - Season 1 
 Evgeniya Kryukova as Lydia Pospelova (Investigator) - Season 1

Series structure 
The series can be divided into two parts:

 Seasons 1 to 6, released from 2000-2003, were set in the 1990s, and featured topics involving bandit lawlessness  and corruption in law enforcement.
 Seasons 7 to 10, released during 2005-2007, had mostly new characters, was set in more recent times and featured topics that involved big business.

Seasons based on the works of   Konstantinov 

 The Baron (2000) - 5 episodes 
 The Lawyer (2000) - 10 episodes 
 The Fall of Antibiotic (2001) - 8 episodes 
 The Prisoner (2003) - 7 episodes 
 The Operative (2003) - 5 episodes 
 The Journalist (2003) - 7 episodes

Seasons based on the works of other writers 
7. Redistribution (2005) - 12 episodes (the script was written based on a concept of Andrei Konstantinov

8. Terminal (2006) - 12 episodes

9. Dutch Passage (2006) - 12 episodes

10. Payback (2007) - 12 episodes

Reaction of Konstantinov to the later episodes 

Konstantinov said that the series Bandit Petersburg consisted of 7 parts rather than 10, since, in his opinion,  Terminal, Dutch Passage  and  Payback  were taken in violation of copyright. Unlike the DVD, these films were broadcast without use of Bandit Petersburg  in the title, although the title was listed in channel information.

Sources 

The original books were:

References

External links
 Informal site
 History of series

NTV (Russia) original programming
Russian police procedural television series
2000s Russian television series
2000 Russian television series debuts
2007 Russian television series endings
Russian crime television series
Television shows set in Saint Petersburg
Fictional portrayals of the Saint Petersburg Police